Hanuman Temple is a temple of Lord Hanuman (also known as Lord Maruti). It is one of the oldest temples in the Beed district of Maharashtra state, India.

The temple's history dates to roughly 300 years ago or possibly earlier. It is located at Pangari (Marutichi) (in Marathi, Maruthichi means "something that belongs to Maruti") close to Beed-Ahmadnagar Road, approximately 45 km from the Beed district towards Ahmadnagar.It is specially famous for control pain of human having snake bite.There are many people come to visit this temple.

Origin 
The temple was built in the 18th century CE (approximately 1700). It has two origin stories:

Story 1 
Around the 16th century a great devotee of Lord Hanuman lived in the nearby region of Balaghat Mountain in Maharashtra. Lord Hanuman blessed this devotee and offered to fulfill any wish. The devotee pleaded with Lord Hanuman to come to his village and inhabit it forever, bestowing grace upon his villagers and their visitors. In response, Lord Hanuman made one condition: that he follow this devotee from a distance, and the devotee must not look back to confirm whether Lord Hanuman was behind him. Lord Hanuman warned that if the devotee looked back, Lord Hanuman would assume the form of a small stone idol and would not go further. The devotee agreed and they started the journey toward his village. They reached a dense forest of cactus (plant from family Cactaceae) and pangara (a plant from genus Pinus). After travelling such a distance, the devotee's doubts overcame his trust, so he looked back. Lord Hanuman had followed, but thereafter declined to come further, transforming into a stone idol. The devotee was disappointed and called upon his villagers to re-colonize there. A new village was formed and named Pangari, from Pangara. It is now recognized as Pangari (Marutichi), abbreviated as 'Pangari (Ma)', which means that Pangari belongs to Lord Maruti.

Story 2 
The idol stone of Lord Hanuman was located at the village Savargaon {some 8 kilometers from Pangari(Ma)), just outside the village in a place used by the villagers as a toilet and garbage disposal. A farmer of Pangari (Ma) once visited Savargaon with a bullock cart. When the farmer left the village, the idol stone got stuck within the hoof of the bullock, and the farmer traveled unaware of this until reaching the site of the modern temple. At this point, the idol stone began to speak to the farmer, saying that the bullock's hoof was causing it pain. The idol stone requested the farmer to draw it out of the hoof and establish a temple for the idol stone there. The farmer did so, convincing the villagers to build a small temple using public funds.

Speciality 
Legend holds that snake bites can be healed at Hanuman Temple. This is done by chanting the mantra 'Bola Maruti Maharajacha Chang Bhala' (which means 'Speak Maruti Maharaja is great and kind'). However, the following rules must also be observed.

 The victim must be accompanied by a group of males, all of whom must take a bath at a well or river beforehand, and carry water with them in a bowl consisting of either metal or soil. This bowl is commonly called a 'Ghagar'. When the group reaches the temple, they must take turns around Lord Hanuman's idol chanting the aforementioned mantra until the snake bite victim wakes up.
 Females must not touch the victim. If they do, then the 'Gomutra' (urine of cow) should be sprinkled over the victim.
 If a female touches the snake bite victim inside the temple, the Lord is left incapable of saving the victim.

Hindu temples in Maharashtra
Tourist attractions in Beed district